The SMI Expanded is a capitalization-weighted stock index of large-cap and mid-cap companies listed on the SIX Swiss Exchange.

It is made up of the components in the Swiss Market Index (SMI) and in the SMI MID, representing more than 90% of the total SPI market capitalization. It was created on November 15, 2004 and retroactively computed from January 3, 1996, with a calibration on 1,000 points as of December 31, 1999.

Current constituents

The current 50 constituents are the 20 large-cap companies listed on the Swiss Market Index (SMI) page and the 30 mid-caps listed on the SMI MID page.

Notes and references

Stock market
Swiss stock market indices